Torgeir Torbjørn Brandtzæg (born 6 October 1941) is a retired Norwegian ski jumper who won bronze medals both in the large hill and normal hill at the 1964 Winter Olympics.

Brandtzæg placed fifth in the Four Hills Tournament in 1963; he won it in 1965, placing first in three out of four events. He also held the national jumping titles in 1963–1965. In 1965, while competing in Finland, he broke his leg in three places and was forced to retire. After that he married and became a farmer in Sparbu. One of his sons, Roy Brandtzæg, became a European powerlifting champion.

References

External links
 

1941 births
Ski jumpers at the 1964 Winter Olympics
Living people
Olympic ski jumpers of Norway
Olympic bronze medalists for Norway
Olympic medalists in ski jumping
Medalists at the 1964 Winter Olympics
20th-century Norwegian people